Jingwu is a railway station in Taichung, Taiwan served by Taiwan Railways. It opened in October 2018 following a delay from March 2017.

Location
Jingwu Station is located in the East District of Taichung City, at the intersection of Nanjing E Road and Fugui Road. It is close to the Taichung Confucius Temple, Taichung Stadium, and Taichung Baseball Field.

See also
 List of railway stations in Taiwan

References

2018 establishments in Taiwan
Railway stations in Taichung
Railway stations opened in 2018
Railway stations served by Taiwan Railways Administration